Parliamentary elections were held in Portugal on 26 June 1904. The result was a victory for the Regeneration Party, which won 100 seats.

Results

The results exclude seats from overseas territories.

References

Legislative elections in Portugal
Portugal
1904 elections in Portugal
June 1904 events